The Kopai River (also called Sal River) is a tributary of the Bakreshwar River. It flows past such towns as Santiniketan, Bolpur, Kankalitala, Kirnahar and Labhpur in Birbhum district in the Indian state of West Bengal. It is a small river in dry season but overflows its banks during the monsoon. There is a village name Chhora (ছোড়া) beside this river. Also Nichinta (নিচিন্তা), Rupuspur (রুপুসপুর), Perua, (পেরুয়া) etc are depend on this river.

Literary association
The area around the river quite often has purple soil, which forms ravines on the river bank with weathering and is popular as the khoai. It has inspired literary figures in the area. It is described by Rabindranath Tagore as follows –
 amader chhoto nadi chale banke bankebaisakh mase taar hantu jal thake
Our small stream moves forward in bends and curvesIn the month of Baisakh it only has knee deep waters

The local name of a sickle-shaped, channel like curve in the river inspired the title of the novel Hansuli Banker Upakatha (Story of the Sickle-shaped Curve) by Tarasankar Bandyopadhyay, made into a  film by Tapan Sinha.

Archaeology
Microliths of crystalline stone and petrified wood from about 1250–1000 BC are found in many places in the Ajay-Kunur-Kopai river system.

See also

List of rivers of India
Rivers of India

References

External links

 Map of Birbhum

Rivers of West Bengal
Rivers of India